is a railway station on the Hachinohe Line in the city of Kuji, Iwate Prefecture, Japan. It is operated by the East Japan Railway Company (JR East).

Lines
Rikuchū-Natsui Station is served by the Hachinohe Line, and is 38.1 kilometers from the terminus of the line at Hachinohe Station.

Station layout
Rikuchū-Natsui Station has a single ground-level side platform serving one bi-directional track. The station is unattended.

History
Rikuchū-Natsui Station opened on March 27, 1930. On April 1, 1987, upon the privatization of Japanese National Railways (JNR), the station came under the operational control of JR East.

Surrounding area
National Route 45
National Route 395

See also
 List of railway stations in Japan

References

External links

 

Railway stations in Iwate Prefecture
Kuji, Iwate
Hachinohe Line
Railway stations in Japan opened in 1930
Stations of East Japan Railway Company